Kiker is a surname. Notable people with the surname include:

Douglas Kiker (1930–1991), American author and journalist
Joe Kiker (1889–1959), Australian rules footballer
Kasey Kiker (born 1987), American baseball player

See also
Iker